The Locust is the debut studio album by American grindcore band The Locust.

Background 
The Locust formed in 1994, the band initially were Justin Pearson and Dylan Scharf, whose other band, Struggle, was about to come to an end. As they recruited Dave Astor, Bobby Bray, and Dave Warshaw the band began paving their powerviolence influenced sound and began developing identity on their early split releases with Man Is The Bastard and Jenny Piccolo. The line up of the band would change over the years with Joseph Karam and Gabe Serbian joining. Starting as a band that fit with their hardcore peers, they soon settled on an aesthetic of sci-fi and entomology would begin to manifest in their artwork and lyrics as early as 1998. Within a few years the band would start performing live in elaborate costumes (dubbed uniforms by the band), this became integral to the band’s persona.

Composition and lyrics 
The album's sound has been described as a mix of grindcore, punk and new wave. David Anthony of Vice, stated "There was a sense of world-building going on with The Locust, as the visuals, music, and lyrics touched on subjects that were never totally aligned with hardcore. Though it wasn’t totally rare for a punk album to run less than 20 minutes, The Locust covered a lot of ground in the LP's 16-and-a-half minutes, as they wrote songs that felt unburdened by punk’s traditions. The songs could be noisy and abrasive, but they’d shift on a dime toward something that, against all odds, was actually kind of catchy." Some commentators have said the lyrics were basically indecipherable, but have also been described as "...like jumping into a pulpy sci-fi film".

Track listing
Side oneSide two1999 3" mini CD release

Personnel
Justin Pearson – vocals, bass guitar
Gabe Serbian – guitar
Joey Karam – keyboards, vocals
Bobby Bray – guitar, vocals
David Astor – drums

References

The Locust albums
1999 debut albums
Gold Standard Laboratories albums